Kayam may refer to:

Kayam (1982 film), a Malayalam film starring Shankar Panicker and Anjali Naidu
Kayam (2011 film), a Malayalam film starring Shwetha Menon and Bala
Hot Springs, Chang Chenmo Valley (called Kayam in Tibetan), location of an Indian border checkpost